is the second highest peak of the Paps of Jura on the island of Jura, Scotland. It stands at 757 metres above sea level, and with over 300 metres of relative height is therefore a Graham.

References

Marilyns of Scotland
Mountains and hills of the Scottish islands
Grahams
Mountains and hills of Argyll and Bute
Sites of Special Scientific Interest in Islay and Jura
Paps of Jura